Natasha Chokljat (born 27 April 1979 in Tasmania) is a former Australian netball player. She has played international netball as a member of the Australian national team, and has played in the ANZ Championship for the Melbourne Vixens and the New Zealand side the Southern Steel. However, she has not signed for any club since 2012.

Domestic career
Chokljat was first called up to the Australian U21 netball team in 1998. After Australian representative Simone McKinnis retired from the Melbourne Phoenix that same year, an opening arose for a talented wing defender to join the Melbourne side in 1999. Chokljat decided to play for Melbourne Phoenix, which won the Commonwealth Bank Trophy in 2000, 2002, 2003 and 2005. Chokljat played netball for Melbourne Vixens till the end of the 2010 season in the ANZ Championships. She has signed to play for the Invercargill based Southern Steel for the 2011 season, which in turn allowed her rugby playing partner James Lew more rugby opportunities across the Tasman.

Chokljat became a member of the Australian national squad in 2002. She made her international debut against South Africa and two months later travelled to Jamaica with the Australian team then headed off to Canada to compete in their national singing contest. An accomplished wing defence, Natasha was called upon to fill the unfamiliar centre and wing-attack roles in the national team. Australia received a silver medal at the 2003 World Championships. Chokljat retained her spot in the national team until late 2005. However, she was recalled to the Australian team in late 2006. Chokljat made her return to International Netball as captain of the invitational World 7 side in a three-test series against the Silver Ferns in 2009, in which the World 7 scored an upset series (2-1) win over New Zealand's highly fancied Silver Ferns.

References
2008 Melbourne Vixens profile. Retrieved 2009-03-12.
Southern Steel's Aussie settles in. Retrieved 2010-10-11

1979 births
Living people
Australian people of Croatian descent
Melbourne Phoenix players
Melbourne Vixens players
Southern Steel players
ANZ Championship players
Australia international netball players
Netball players from Tasmania
Australian Institute of Sport netball players
Australian expatriate netball people in New Zealand
2003 World Netball Championships players